Hurricane Inga is the third longest-lived Atlantic hurricane on record. The 11th tropical cyclone and 9th named storm of the 1969 Atlantic hurricane season, Inga developed on September 20 in the central Atlantic and tracked westward. After attaining tropical storm status, the system deteriorated into a depression, but once again intensified several days later. The storm eventually peaked in strength on October 5, with winds corresponding to Category 2 on the modern-day Saffir–Simpson hurricane scale. Throughout its path, Inga underwent several changes in direction and oscillations in strength, before dissipating on October 15, 25 days after it formed. Despite its duration, Inga caused little damage, and mostly remained over open waters.

Meteorological history

On September 20, a tropical disturbance in the Atlantic Ocean developed into a tropical depression. However, by September 23, the storm had become disorganized and sprawling. Later that day, Inga weakened back into a tropical depression.

The depression continued west-northwestward, passing north of the Leeward Islands, before drifting northwestward. It once again attained tropical storm status on September 28, while situated well to the east of the Bahamas. Inga continued to intensify, and achieved hurricane status at 0000 UTC on September 30, at which point it turned northeastward. The storm then abruptly, yet gradually, turned towards the south, and ultimately completed a counter-clockwise loop as it bent back westward. Steering currents were weak, and the hurricane continued to proceed slowly. Late on October 3, it turned to the northwest, still as a Category 1 hurricane on the modern-day Saffir–Simpson hurricane scale. The storm then curved northeastward and intensified to Category 2 status at 0000 UTC on October 5.

Inga accelerated somewhat as it passed to the southeast of Bermuda. By the morning hours of October 5, it was determined that the hurricane posed no significant threat to the island. At 1200 UTC, the storm's lowest known barometric pressure of 964 millibars was recorded. As it moved towards the open waters of the Atlantic and entered a cooler environment, it deteriorated to Category 1 intensity on October 6. The hurricane slowed again, and as cold air became entrained into its circulation, it began to lose tropical characteristics.

However, Inga once again intensified and reattained Category 2 intensity on October 7. At this point, the hurricane was drifting generally eastward. However, in time the storm turned towards the south and began to weaken. Operationally, the storm was believed to have downgraded to a tropical storm on October 8 and regained hurricane status thereafter, but instead it likely maintained Category 1 intensity steadily until October 10. After the storm finally degenerated into a tropical storm, it curved southwestward. The storm's center became ill-defined and elongated at the storm continued to lose strength.

Impact and records
Hurricane Inga lasted for nearly 25 days between September 20 and October 15. This made it the third longest-tracked Atlantic hurricane on record, behind the 1899 San Ciriaco hurricane and Hurricane Ginger in September–October 1971. The fourth, fifth, and sixth longest-lived storms are Hurricane Nadine in 2012, Hurricane Kyle in 2002, and Hurricane Four in 1926. At the time of its existence, however, Inga was believed to have been the longest-lived Atlantic tropical cyclone on record. The National Hurricane Center issued 72 total advisories on the storm.

While Inga remained predominately over the open ocean, its outer fringes produced  wind gusts on Bermuda. The strong winds caused power failures, which were promptly restored. Residents were advised to monitor the storm in case of sudden changes in direction.

See also

1969 Atlantic hurricane season
List of Bermuda hurricanes

References

External links

1969 Atlantic hurricane season
Category 2 Atlantic hurricanes
Hurricanes in Bermuda